Adina is a town and union council of Swabi District in Khyber Pakhtunkhwa.  It is located at an altitude of 303 metres (997 feet).

References

Populated places in Swabi District
Union Councils of Swabi District